N. darwini may refer to:
 Neobrachypterus darwini
 Nervellius darwini
 Nesoryzomys darwini, the Darwin's nesoryzomys, Darwin's rice rat or Darwin's Galápagos mouse, a rodent species
 Nettastomella darwini, a bivalve mollusc species in the genus Nettastomella and the family Pholadidae
 Nocticanace darwini

See also
 N. darwinii (disambiguation)
 Darwini (disambiguation)